Alejandro Suárez Velázquez  (born 30 November 1980 in Santiago de Querétaro, Querétaro) is a Mexican former long-distance runner who specializes in the 5000 metres. His personal best time is 13:18.13 minutes, achieved in June 2003 in Victoria. He clocked a sub four-minute mile (3:59.81) in Burnaby, BC in 2005.

He was a two-time winner of the North American 5K Championships, taking the 2003 and 2004 titles – he was the only man to win multiple times at the competition. He won the silver medal at the 2006 NACAC Cross Country Championships.

International competitions

References

External links

1980 births
Living people
Mexican male long-distance runners
Mexican male marathon runners
Athletes (track and field) at the 2004 Summer Olympics
Athletes (track and field) at the 2008 Summer Olympics
Athletes (track and field) at the 2003 Pan American Games
Athletes (track and field) at the 2007 Pan American Games
Olympic athletes of Mexico
Sportspeople from Querétaro City
World Athletics Championships athletes for Mexico
Pan American Games medalists in athletics (track and field)
Athletes (track and field) at the 2015 Pan American Games
Pan American Games bronze medalists for Mexico
Central American and Caribbean Games silver medalists for Mexico
Competitors at the 2006 Central American and Caribbean Games
Central American and Caribbean Games medalists in athletics
Medalists at the 2007 Pan American Games
21st-century Mexican people